Cecilia Makiwane (1880–1919) was the first African registered professional nurse in what would become South Africa and an early activist in the struggle for women's rights.

Early life
Cecilia Makiwane was born in 1880 at the MacFarlane Mission in Victoria East, a district about 10 km away from Alice in what was the Cape Colony. Her father was Reverend Elijah Makiwane, a pioneering clergyman and the second Black minister ordained in the Presbyterian Church who was trained in South Africa. Her mother Maggie Majiza was an assistant teacher at a girls' school in Alice. Maggie died in 1883 when Cecilia was two years old. Her parents had three children, Daisy (1878), Cecilia (1880) and Ashton (1882). Cecilia attended the Lovedale Girls' School where she obtained a teacher's certificate.

Her niece Noni Jabavu became a well-known novelist.

Education
The Victoria Hospital, the first mission hospital in South Africa, opened in 1898 and closed during the Boer War. The hospital reopened in 1903 and launched a three-year nurse training programme in the same year. In 1907, Mina Colani and Makiwane both enrolled and received a Hospital Proficiency Certificate after three years. Makiwane enrolled for a further year of training and passed the Cape Colonial Medical Council examination on 19 December 1907. She became the first Black woman to be a licensed by the state as a professional nurse in Africa in January 1908. When she received her license, the only other women of colour who were trained as nurses were Maori women in New Zealand.

Nursing in South Africa
Bantu nursing was introduced with the growing need for Xhosa people in King William’s Town to have nurses who shared their cultural background. This led to Makiwane qualifying as a professional nurse in 1908. At the time, only 6% of Black women in the country could read and write. Only those with nine to 10 years of schooling could register. Makiwane had nine years of schooling before she started the training course. The lack of adequate schooling for Black people hindered many from entering the field which required to pass a written examination in English or Afrikaans.

In 1910, the government started training more Black women. Under colonial rule, the Transvaal and the Orange Free State commenced nurse training for Black women in the 1930s and 1950s, respectively. Other mission hospitals also trained more Black women in order to provide healthcare in rural areas. The field was only gradually opened to Black women with 255 Black nurses training nationwide in 1937. By the 1940s, there were only about 800 registered Black nurses in the country. By 1990, of the approximately 15 000 nurses who were registered with the South African Nursing Council, about two-thirds were people of colour.

Activism
In 1912, Makiwane took part in what was probably the first women's anti-pass campaign. In this campaign, a petition was signed by some 5000 African and mixed-ancestry women in the Free State (province). It was sent to Louis Botha demanding for the pass laws to be repealed.

Retirement
She resumed work with the Lovedale Hospital and served the hospital until she was granted long leave due to ill health.

Death and legacy
After leaving Lovedale she joined her sister, Majombozi in Thaba 'Nchu where she eventually died in 1919 at the age of 39. 
A statue of Cecilia Makiwane was erected by the nurses of South Africa at the Lovedale Hospital in 1977. A postage stamp was issued in 1982 to honour local heroine Cecilia Makiwane by the short-lived republic "Ciskei", now known as the Eastern Cape. The Cecilia Makiwane Nurse's Recognition Award for health care professionals, was introduced by the South African government in 2002 in her honour. Cecilia Makiwane Hospital in Mdantsane township in the Eastern Cape has been named after her.

See also
 Noni Jabavu (niece)
 Cecilia Makiwane Hospital

Notes

References
South African History Online, Cecilia Makiwane, sited 1 December 2013
Department of Health, South Africa, Speech by the Minister at the Cecilia Makiwane Nurses' Recognition Award Ceremony, 5 April 2002
Royal College of Nursing, Cecilia Makiwane (1880-1919), sited 1 December 2013

1880 births
1919 deaths
People from Amathole District Municipality
Cape Colony people
Xhosa people
South African nurses